Thailand's Next Top Model was a Thai reality television show based on America's Next Top Model that aired in 2005. The show was hosted by Thai supermodel Sonia Couling. The show's only season aired on ThaiTV 3 every Wednesday and Thursday at 21.50-22.00. It began airing on 18 May 2005 and ended on 28 August 2005.

Week by week one of the girls is eliminated until only one remains and is crowned Thailand's Next Top Model. The prize for winning Thailand's Next Top Model included a contract with Elite Model Management in Bangkok, a campaign for Pond's, and cash prize of 500.000 Baht and a brand new Toyota. It was won by You Kheawchaum from Samut Songkhram.

Overview 
The show takes 500 applicants from around the country and selects 13 final participants, who then have to live together for 13 weeks.

Every week, another girl is eliminated through a series of photo shoots. In episodes 9 and 10, the top 5 girls took a trip to Tokyo, Japan. In the last episode, the last two girls compete to be the winner of the competition.

Cycles

Episode summaries

Episodes 1-2

Original airdate: May 18–19, 2005

First call-out: Luktarn Puagkong
Bottom two: Yok Boonchuay & Fon Dalhek
Eliminated: Yok Boonchuay

Episodes 3-4

Original airdate: May 25–26, 2005

First call-out: Ann Christodurachris
Bottom two: Fon Dalhek & Lukkade Piampiboon
Eliminated: Fon Dalhek

Episodes 5-6 

Original airdate: June 1–2, 2005

First call-out: Gift Teerawisutkul
Bottom two: Jha Phuenghan & Ann Christodurachris
Eliminated: Ann Christodurachris

Episodes 7-8

Original airdate: June 8–9, 2005

First call-out: Nok Pomanee
Bottom two: Lukkade Piampiboon & Jha Phuenghan
Eliminated: Jha Phuenghan

Episodes 9-10

Original airdate: June 15–16, 2005

First call-out: May Sutpa
Bottom two: Tai Watmeuang & Nok Pomanee
Eliminated: Tai Watmeuang

Episodes 11-12

Original airdate: June 22–23, 2005

First call-out: Gib Ngarmniyom
Bottom two: Luktarn Puagkong & Lukkade Piampiboon
Eliminated: Lukkade Piampiboon

Episodes 13-14

Original airdate: June 29–30, 2005

First call-out: You Kheawchaum
Bottom two: Gift Teerawisutkul & Apple Karachoth
Eliminated: Gift Teerawisutkul

Episodes 15-16

Original airdate: July 6–7, 2005

First call-out: Nok Pomanee
Bottom two: Luktarn Puagkong & Apple Karachoth
Eliminated: Apple Karachoth

Episodes 17-18

Original airdate: July 13–14, 2005

First call-out: You Kheawchaum
Bottom two: Nok Pomanee & Gib Ngarmniyom
Eliminated: Gib Ngarmniyom

Episodes 19-20

Original airdate: July 20–21, 2005

First call-out: May Sutpa
Bottom two: Nok Pomanee & Luktarn Puagkong
Eliminated: Luktarn Puagkong

Episodes 21-22

Original airdate: July 27–28, 2005

Recap episode.

Episodes 23-24

Original airdate: August 10–11, 2005

First call-out: May Sutpa
Bottom two: You Kheawchaum & Nok Pomanee
Eliminated: Nok Pomanee

Episodes 25-26

Original airdate: August 17–18, 2005

Final Two: May Sutpa & You Kheawchaum

In this episode, the competition ended, but the winner was announced on August 28, 2005.

Special episode

Original airdate: August 28, 2005

This episode was reunion and talk show of contestants.  was moderator this show. Ann can't go to the reunion because she had a mission in "Miss Thailand World 2005" contest at Si Racha, but she had connected in a VTR live from her to greet all the contestants. And then, the show had been cut when Sonia Couling  announced the winner in episode 13. You was the winner.

Thailand's Next Top Model: You Kheawchaum

Contestants

(ages stated are at start of contest)

Summaries

Call-out order

 The contestant was eliminated
 The contestant won the competition
 In episode 7, the top 7 girls had makeovers.
 In episode 9 and 10, the top 5 girls gone to tournament on Japan.
 Episode 11 was the recap episode.
 In special episode was a reunion and talk show of contestants. Then, the winner was announced.

Photo Shoot & Competition Guide
Episode 1 Photo Shoot: Ayuthaya Temple 
Episode 2 Photo Shoot: Daybeds Magazine
Episode 3 Competition: Runway for Act cloth
Episode 4 Photo Shoot: AIIZ on the beach
Episode 5 Photo Shoot: Levi's Jeans with male model
Episode 6 Competition: Acting show on stage
Episode 7 Photo Shoot: L'Oréal Feria
Episode 8 Photo Shoot: Diamond and Animals
Episode 9 Photo Shoot: Cars and Spacegirl
Episode 10 Photo Shoot: Lingerie in Japan
Episode 12 Photo Shoot: Leo Beer
Episode 13 Photo Shoot & Commercial: Pond's Day cream Commercial and Print Ad

Makeovers
This season's makeovers included teeth whitening for the top seven girls.
Gift: Light brown and curled
Apple: Dark, Long, and parted
Gib: Mia Farrow in Rosemary's Baby inspired short hairstyle
Luktarn: Dark blonde
Nok: Afro style
May: Light brown bob cut
You: Cut short and colored Red

Presenter & Judges
 Sonia Couling, supermodel as presenter & judge
 Rungnapa Kittivat, supermodel as judges
 Sira "O" Kulsrethsiri, fashion stylist as judges

References

Top Model
Channel 3 (Thailand) original programming
Thai reality television series
2005 Thai television series debuts
2005 Thai television series endings
Thai television series based on American television series
Television shows filmed in Thailand
Television shows filmed in Japan